The 2010 European Juniors Wrestling Championships was held in Samokov, Bulgaria between 28 June – 4 July 2010.

Medal table

Team ranking

Medal summary

Men's freestyle

Men's Greco-Roman

Women's freestyle

References

External links
Official website

Wrestling
European Wrestling Juniors Championships
International wrestling competitions hosted by Bulgaria